Titidiops is a genus of spiders in the family Thomisidae. It was first described in 1929 by Mello-Leitão. , it contains only one Brazilian species, Titidiops melanosternus.

References

Thomisidae
Monotypic Araneomorphae genera
Spiders of Brazil